Londongrad is a Russian crime comedy television series, the first series on Russian television to be shot in the capital of the United Kingdom.

The television series was created by Sputnik Vostok Production, commissioned by STS.

Plot
Londongrad is a special agency which solves any problems that Russian people might face in the capital of the United Kingdom for a hefty fee; starting from ordinary tourists who lost their luggage, to the children of major officials arrested for mixing up the Winston Churchill monument with a public toilet. The owner and only employee of the agency is 27 year old Misha Kulikov (Nikita Yefremov), a mathematics genius and former Oxford student who dropped out five years ago and now takes up any orders as a kind of "fixer". But Russian clients of Kulikov in London have problems more of the domestic type than of criminal...

Cast
Nikita Yefremov as Misha Kulikov - founder and senior partner of the agency "Londongrad"
Ingrid Olerinskaya as Alisa Zagorskaya - daughter of an oligarch, junior partner of the agency "Londongrad"
Pavel Ilyin as Stepan Sysoev - former policeman, now - driver of the agency "Londongrad"
Sergey Rost as Boris Brikman - lawyer and main client of the agency
Regina Miannik as Jeanne Brickman - Boris's wife, former model and aspiring actress
Eugene Morozov as Oleg Dorokhov - Misha's friend from Oxford
Kirill Dubrovitsky as Viktor Sergeevich Zagorsky - Alisa's father, a major Moscow construction businessman
Alexander Ilyin as Alexey - Zagorsky's aide
Andrei Kaverin as Alexey Danilin - a young and successful businessman, Zagorsky's main competitor
Sergei Yushkevich as Gleb Tsygankov (man in a raincoat) - Misha's mysterious creditor
Artem Osipov as Pavel Grigoryevich Kulikov - Mikhail's older brother, talented programmer from St. Petersburg
Elena Valushkina as Pasha and Misha's mother - teacher from Manchester
Sergei Lanbamin as Gennady Vadimovich Akimov - resident of the Foreign Intelligence Service at the Russian Embassy in the UK
Nikita Panfilov as Vadim Komarov - chef at the restaurant "Less", friend of the agency
Maria Zykov as hacker Sasha / FIS agent "Viktoria"

Ratings
The series premiered successfully on the STS channel. The first episode of Londongrad was watched by every fifth Moscow resident. The project, according to TNS Russia, became the leader in its slot in Moscow among all TV channels, with a share of 20.9% in the audience of 10-45 and a share of 27.5% among viewers aged 11 to 34. In the category of viewers older than four years old, the first season started with a rating of 2.5 and a share of 8.7, by the beginning of the second season the rating had dropped to 1.7, and the share had dropped to 5.4, after which the series ceased to be in the top 10 programs of STS. The reason for the decreased viewer interest was that the ruble dropped after the first season (1-16 episodes) and for financial reasons the rest of the episodes were no longer shot on location.

References

External links

Films directed by Dmitriy Kiselev
Russian crime television series
Russian comedy television series
2010s Russian television series
2015 Russian television series debuts
2015 Russian television series endings
STS (TV channel) original programming